The Davao Oriental State University (DOrSU) is a state-funded research-based coeducational higher education institution in Mati City, Davao Oriental, Philippines. It was founded on December 13, 1989.

History

Mati Community College
The Mati Community College was a local government-run community college established in 1972 that offered liberal arts and business-oriented programs. It was headed by Dr. Leopoldo Bravo of the Department of Education, Culture and Sports.

Early years: 1989–1997
On December 13, 1989, the Mati Community College (MCC) was converted into Davao Oriental State College of Science and Technology (DOSCST) by virtue of Republic Act 6807. The aforementioned law was authored by Mayor Thelma Z. Almario when she was the Representative of the 2nd district of Davao Oriental.

On May 20, 1990, Dr. Julieta I. Ortiz was appointed as founding president. The newly chartered college started operations in June 1990.

And with its new mandate provided by its charter, curricular programs were reoriented towards science and technology. Classes were initially held in three buildings located at the old site at Barangay Sainz until the college moved to its present 10-hectare site, 5 km away from Mati, Davao Oriental proper in September 1991. Mindanao Agro-Pioneers Corporation owned by the heirs of the late Don Jose Corro Martinez Sr. donated this site, a flat land about 300 meters from the shores of Pujada Bay.

On the new site, the initial structures were built, a concrete road leading to the campus was constructed, electricity and communication lines were connected. Bright and promising professionals were recruited to man the faculty, new academic programs were crafted, and the arduous path towards instituting relevant research and extension programs was blazed. The difficult task of instituting an academic culture comparable to national standards also commenced.

To speed up institutional growth, Dr. Ortiz established linkage with other higher education institutions, including other government and private organizations. Soon, some faculty members were sent for advanced studies, senior faculty from established universities were invited, while the instructional, research and extension programs began to take on respectable form and substance. The college's library collection registered rapid growth and instructional facilities were relentlessly improved. As the early batches of students graduated, so did they register respectable performance in licensure examinations and desirability among employers.

1997–present

Dr. Jonathan A. Bayogan was appointed as second president in June 1997 and was reappointed for a second term in June 2003. During his term, extension campuses were established in San Isidro in November 1997 and in Cateel in June 1999. Additional structures were built, instructional and support facilities were improved while communication facilities were kept up-to-date. The faculty profile tremendously improved through faculty development aided largely through grants and assistance from the Commission on Higher Education, bilateral scholarships and local assistance. Curricular programs were improved and short-term courses were upgraded to degree programs. Graduate programs in education were eventually opened through the assistance of local government units.

As a quality assurance scheme, academic programs were subjected to accreditation and some attained Level 2 status in due time. Linkage with other colleges and universities were strengthened through resource sharing and collaboration. Research and extension developed as faculty outputs were presented and gained acceptance in regional and national fora. Projects funded by agencies like the Commission on Higher Education, the Department of Science and Technology, the Department of Agriculture, Department of Agrarian Reform, USAID, AusAid began to come in. Graduates did not only perform well in licensure examinations but a few also barged into the Top Ten circle.

The college also grew in its effort to preserve and showcase the region's culture and arts. The college gained recognition by representing the municipality, the province and the region in regional and national cultural presentations. The college's culture and arts groups, Dagmay, and Pagdungawan were feted with recognition among cultural groups, regionally and nationally.

Capping the term of Dr. Bayogan was the college's elevation from Level 1 to a Level 3 state college, using a nationwide leveling criteria for all state universities and colleges (SUC) in the country. DOSCST has the distinction of having the least budget allocation among Level 3 SUCs.

Dr. Grace G. Lopez assumed office as president in July 2007.  She was succeeded by Dr. Edito B. Sumile who assumed office in January 2012.

Campus 
The current 10-hectare campus is located on Martinez Drive, Guang-guang, Dahican, Mati, Davao Oriental. It was donated by the Mindanao Agro-Pioneers Corporation owned by the heirs of the late Don José Corro Martínez Sr. It is a flat land approximately 300 meters from the shores of Pujada Bay.

It also has extension campuses in the municipalities of Banaybanay and Banganga, both located in the province of Davao Oriental.

Academic programs

Graduate programs 
 Master of Science in Teaching – General Science
 Master of Science in Teaching – Mathematics
 Master of Arts in Education – Education Management
 Master of Arts in Education – Teaching English
 Master of Public Administration

Undergraduate programs

Institute of Agriculture and Life Sciences 
 Bachelor of Science in Agribusiness Management
 Bachelor of Agricultural Technology
 Bachelor of Science in Biology
 Bachelor of Science in Development Communication
 Bachelor of Science in Environmental Science
 Bachelor of Science in Nursing

Institute of Business and Public Affairs 
 Bachelor of Science in Business Administration
 Bachelor of Science in Criminology
 Bachelor of Science in Hotel and Restaurant Management

Institute of Computing and Engineering 
 Bachelor of Science in Civil Engineering
 Bachelor of Industrial Technology Management
 Bachelor of Science in Information Technology
 Bachelor of Science in Mathematics with Business and Finance

Institute of Education and Teacher Training 
 Bachelor of Elementary Education
 Bachelor of Secondary Education major in Biological Sciences
 Bachelor of Secondary Education major in English
 Bachelor of Secondary Education major in Mathematics
 Bachelor of Secondary Education major in Science
 Bachelor of Physical Education major in School Physical Education
 Bachelor of Special Needs Education

References

External links
Accrediting Agency of Chartered Colleges and Universities in the Philippines(AACCUP)
Commission on Higher Education
Local Government of Mati, Davao Oriental

State universities and colleges in the Philippines
Mindanao Association State Colleges and Universities Foundation
Universities and colleges in Davao Oriental
Philippine Association of State Universities and Colleges